The 1944 United States Senate election in Arizona took place on November 7, 1944. Incumbent Democratic U.S. Senator Carl Hayden ran for reelection to a fourth term, defeating Republican nominee Fred Wildon Fickett Jr., in the general election.

Democratic primary

Candidates
 Carl T. Hayden, incumbent U.S. Senator
 Joe Conway, Attorney General of Arizona
 Henderson Stockton, candidate for U.S. Senate in 1940

Results

Republican primary

Candidates
 Fred Wildon Fickett Jr.

General election

See also 
 United States Senate elections, 1944

References

1944
Arizona
United States Senate